Beagle Peak is a peak rising to about  in the central part of the Lassus Mountains, Alexander Island, Antarctica. It is situated 5.55 km west by south of Moriseni Peak. The feature was named by the Advisory Committee on Antarctic Names for Lieutenant Commander Clyde A. Beagle, U.S. Navy, LC-130 aircraft commander, Squadron VXE-6, U.S. Navy Operation Deepfreeze, 1969 and 1970.

See also
 Saint George Peak
 Hageman Peak
 Duffy Peak

References
 

Mountains of Alexander Island